The Rural Municipality of Brenda is a former rural municipality (RM) in the Canadian province of Manitoba. It was originally incorporated as a rural municipality on December 22, 1883. It ceased on January 1, 2015 as a result of its provincially mandated amalgamation with the Village of Waskada to form the Municipality of Brenda – Waskada.

The RM was located in the southwestern part of the province, along the border with the state of North Dakota in the United States. It had a 2006 Census population of 549 persons, a decline from the 2001 Census figure of 616 persons.

Geography 
According to Statistics Canada, the rural municipality had an area of 766.00 km2 (295.75 sq mi). The main settlements within the RM were Goodlands, Leighton, Medora, and Napinka.

Adjacent municipalities 
Rural Municipality of Arthur - (west)
Rural Municipality of Cameron - (north)
Rural Municipality of Winchester - (east)
Bottineau County, North Dakota - (south)

References 

 Manitoba Historical Society - Rural Municipality of Brenda
 Map of Brenda R.M. at Statcan

Former rural municipalities in Manitoba
Populated places disestablished in 2015
2015 disestablishments in Manitoba